Pristurus mazbah is a species of lizard in the Sphaerodactylidae family found in Yemen.

References

Pristurus
Reptiles described in 1989